Euspira guilleminii is a species of predatory sea snail, a marine gastropod mollusk in the family Naticidae, the moon snails.

Description
The length of the shell attains 8.3 mm.

References

 Arnaud, P. M., 1978. Révision des taxa malacologiques méditerrannéens introduits par Antoine Risso. Annales du Muséum d'Histoire Naturelle de Nice "1977"5: 101-150
 Gofas, S.; Le Renard, J.; Bouchet, P. (2001). Mollusca. in: Costello, M.J. et al. (eds), European Register of Marine Species: a check-list of the marine species in Europe and a bibliography of guides to their identification. Patrimoines Naturels. 50: 180-213.
 Torigoe K. & Inaba A. (2011). Revision on the classification of Recent Naticidae. Bulletin of the Nishinomiya Shell Museum. 7: 133 + 15 pp., 4 pls

External links
 Payraudeau B. C. (1826). Catalogue descriptif et méthodique des Annelides et des Mollusques de l'île de Corse. Paris, 218 pp. + 8 pl
 Risso, A. (1826-1827). Histoire naturelle des principales productions de l'Europe Méridionale et particulièrement de celles des environs de Nice et des Alpes Maritimes. Paris, Levrault:. . 3(XVI): 1-480, 14 pls

Naticidae